Croom Glacier is a steep, broad glacier flowing to the head of Smith Inlet between Moe Point and Hughes Ice Piedmont, on the east coast of Palmer Land. It was mapped by the United States Geological Survey in 1974, and named by the Advisory Committee on Antarctic Names for John M. Croom, who was a United States Antarctic Research Program biologist at Palmer Station in 1968–69 and a U.S. Exchange Scientist at the Soviet Bellingshausen Station in 1970.

References
 

Glaciers of Palmer Land